Scholz's Star  (WISE designation WISE 0720−0846 or fully WISE J072003.20−084651.2) is a dim binary stellar system  from the Sun in the constellation Monoceros near the galactic plane. It was discovered in 2013 by astronomer Ralf-Dieter Scholz. In 2015, Eric Mamajek and collaborators reported the system passed through the Solar System's Oort cloud roughly 70,000 years ago, and dubbed it Scholz's Star.

Characteristics
The primary is a red dwarf with a stellar classification of M and  Jupiter masses. The secondary is probably a T5 brown dwarf with  Jupiter masses. The system has 0.15 solar masses. The system has an apparent magnitude of 18.3, and is estimated to be between 3 and 10 billion years old. With a parallax of 166 mas (0.166 arcseconds), about 80 star systems are known to be closer to the Sun. It is a late discovery, as far as nearby stars go, because past efforts concentrated on high-proper-motion objects.

Solar System flyby
Ninety-eight percent of mathematical simulations of the star system's trajectory indicated that it passed through the Solar System's Oort cloud, or within  of the Sun. Comets perturbed from the Oort cloud would require roughly two million years to get to the inner Solar System. At closest approach the system would have had an apparent magnitude of about 11.4, and would have been best viewed from high latitudes in the northern hemisphere.

In 2018, research was published indicating that disturbance of the Oort cloud will have a greater effect than initial research had indicated.

In a recent estimate, WISE J0720−0846AB passed within 68.7 ± 2.0 kAU of the Sun 80.5 ± 0.7 kyr ago. A later recalculation of the impact parameters using updated Solar System data showed that the perihelion distance during the encounter had a median value of 0.330 pc with a 90% probability of having come within 0.317–0.345 pc of the Sun; the associated time of perihelion passage was determined to be between 78.6–81.1 kyr ago with 90% confidence, with a most likely value of 79.9 kyr.

A star is expected to pass through the Oort cloud every 100,000 years or so. An approach as close or closer than 52,000 AU is expected to occur about every 9 million years. In about 1.4 million years, Gliese 710 will come to a perihelion of between 8,800 and 13,700 AU.

Naming

The star was first discovered to be a nearby one by astronomer Ralf-Dieter Scholz, announced on arXiv in November 2013. Given the importance of the system having passed so close to the Solar System in prehistorical times, Eric Mamajek and collaborators dubbed the system Scholz's star in their paper discussing the star's velocity and past trajectory.

See also 
 List of nearest stars and brown dwarfs#Distant future and past encounters
 HIP 85605
 Stars named after people

References 

201311??
Binary stars
Brown dwarfs
M-type main-sequence stars
T-type stars
Monoceros (constellation)
Stars with proper names
WISE objects
J07200325-0846499
Oort cloud